Peter of Eboli or Petrus de Ebulo (flourished ) was a didactic versifier and chronicler who wrote in Latin.

A monk from Eboli (Campania, then part of the Kingdom of Naples), Peter became a court poet to Henry VI, Holy Roman Emperor and King of Sicily. His flattering verse Liber ad honorem Augusti, sive de rebus Siculis (Book to honor the Emperor, or The Affairs of Sicily), probably written in Palermo, was his first work; it was dedicated to Henry VI, King of Sicily by right of his wife Constance, the Norman heiress and mother of the heir who would be "in every way blessed" according to Peter—Frederick II, stupor mundi— whose birth is described in terms reshaped from Virgil's fourth Eclogue, which Christians read as foretelling the coming of Christ. The book celebrates in glowing terms the victory of Henry over his opponent, the illegitimate usurper Tancred, who, though a doughty fighter, was of such short stature that Peter ridicules him as Tancredulus ("Little Tancred"). The copy from Palermo is illuminated with palace scenes, processions, and battles in tableaux that vie with the text itself and form a precious record of twelfth-century life, as those of the Bayeux tapestry do for the eleventh.

Peter of Eboli also wrote a didactic poem, De balneis Puteolanis ("The Baths of Pozzuoli") that is the first widely distributed guidebook to thermal baths, a weapon in the local economic rivalries that arose over healing, medicinal bathing and the medieval tourist industry in southern Italy during the High Middle Ages. A copy is included in the historical miscellany at the Huntington Library, HM 1342.

Peter is known to have written three poems because he lists them all at the end of De balneis Puteolanis in the following elegiac couplets:

The second poem of the three listed here, the mira Federici gesta ("remarkable deeds of Frederick") is lost.

Notes

References
 "Guide To Medieval and Renaissance Manuscripts in the Huntington Library" HM 1342 See folios 176-187.
 Mario Sirpettino, "The healing powers of the thermo-mineral waters in the Phlegraean Fields" Baths listed by Peter of Eboli.
 Theo Kölzer und Marlis Stähli (Edd.): Petrus de Ebulo: Liber ad honorem Augusti sive de rebus Siculis. Codex 120 II der Burgerbibliothek Bern. Eine Bilderchronik der Stauferzeit, Textrevision und Übersetzung von Gereon Becht-Jördens (Jan Thorbecke Verlag), Sigmaringen 1994  (reproductions in high quality of the entire manuscript)

External links

 Peter of Eboli: De balneis Puteolanis, Italian digitized codex, at Somni

12th-century births
13th-century deaths
People from Eboli
Medieval Latin poets
Italian poets
Italian male poets
12th-century Italian historians
12th-century Latin writers
12th-century Italian physicians
12th-century Italian poets
Italian male non-fiction writers
Physicians from Naples
Court of Frederick II, Holy Roman Emperor